National Highway 116 (NH 116) is a National Highway of India entirely within the state of West Bengal that connects Kolaghat in Purba Medinipur district with Haldia in Purba Medinipur district. NH-116 is a spur road of National Highway 16. The primary purpose of this national highway is to provide connectivity to Haldia Port. Previously this route was numbered as National Highway 41.

Route

NH 116 connects Kolaghat, Mecheda, Nandakumar and Haldia port.

Junctions

  Terminal near Kolaghat.
  near Nandakumar

Toll Plaza
There is only 1 toll plaza on this highway at Sonapetya

See also
 List of National Highways in India (by Highway Number)
 List of National Highways in India
 National Highways Development Project

References

External links 
 NH 116 on OpenStreetMap
  Route map of NH 41

Transport in Haldia
National highways in India
National Highways in West Bengal